They Would Never Hurt a Fly is a 2004 historical non-fiction novel by Slavenka Drakulić discussing the personalities of the war criminals on trial in The Hague that destroyed the former Yugoslavia (see International Criminal Tribunal for the Former Yugoslavia). Drakulić uses certain trials of alleged criminals with subordinate power to further examine and understand the reasoning behind their misconducts. Most of those discussed are already convicted. In her book, Drakulić does not cover Radovan Karadžić, however, Slobodan Milošević and his wife each rate their own chapter, and Ratko Mladić is portrayed as a Greek tragic figure. There are no pictures, although the physical appearances of the characters are continuously mentioned.

Synopsis

They Would Never Hurt a Fly begins with an introductory section explaining Drakulić's purpose in the book as well as her choice in characters. She explains that she wants to learn more about their personalities in order to justify how the Yugoslavian war arose. Drakulić describes the war as an unexpected tragedy that embarked on innocent civilians within the boundaries of Yugoslavia - specifically Bosnia. As the book begins to unravel descriptive profiles of different war criminals, Drakulić elucidates that these criminals were not completely monsters, but ordinary people who committed crimes due to the circumstances they were in. She takes this stance not to sympathize with them, but because "the war itself turned ordinary men [...] into criminals because of opportunism, fear and, not least, conviction."  By treating such people as criminals without understanding their background, she argues, put them in a different class of people that they could never be a part of. As a result, they refuse to believe that themselves, their neighbours or their co-workers could commit such acts. Many of the perpetrators actually regard themselves as heroes rather than criminals and only regret "that they have been stupid enough to get caught or being tricked into surrendering."  This argument is mirrored with political theorist Hannah Arendt's thesis on the Banality of Evil.

The book ends noting the strange coexistence that the accused war criminals have together in the Scheveningen prison in The Hague. Despite containing people who had committed atrocities at all levels, there was only one incident that occurred when Slobodan Milošević was first brought to the "detention unit". Despite this, most of those convicted put aside their nationality and their ethnic backgrounds, and formed alliances based on brotherhood and friendship. As Irish director of the "unit", Timothy McFadden argues the accused are held as innocent until proven guilty, and thus are treated to better living conditions than any other prison in Europe, and possibly the world. They can watch television shows in their own language (via satellite) enclosed in their fairly spacious cells, have visitors as frequently as they would like, take a variety of classes, and so on. Drakulić notes the disparity between their living conditions and the crimes they are accused of, then ends by questioning the aim of the war if the greatest architects of it can get along with no animosity or patriotic feelings behind closed doors. The answer, she concludes, is that it was ultimately for nothing.

Reception

Drakulić received the 2005 Leipzig Book Award for European Understanding for this work.

Popular Reviews

Melissa Benn of The Guardian commends Drakulić for how she "demonstrates no little moral courage" in revisiting these historical events so soon after "the horrors of war" ended. Benn speaks positively of Drakulić's high level of detail and handling of moral ambiguity.

Academic Reviews

Jens Becker highlights Drakulic's personal history as a Yugoslavian as a means by which Drakulic adds necessary context to her book's discussions in his review for the Journal for Labour and Social Affairs in Eastern Europe. Becker applauds in particular how Drakulic can explore why the war began, how nationalism developed in a generation seemingly born into an integrated environment, and why individuals charged as war criminals are still seen as heroes in their home countries. By exploring detailed backgrounds and wartime accounts, Drakulic can better understand the perpetrators on a human level. In particular, in Drakulic's exploration of Milosevic, she "deprives him of his demonic aura by forming an intelligent portrait," thereby providing a fuller account than one possible with use of just his political or wartime life.

People covered
 Rahim Ademi 
 Milan Čanić
 Dražen Erdemović
 Stjepan Grandić
 Goran Jelisić
 Radovan Karadžić
 Radomir Kovač
 Radislav Krstić
 Dragoljub Kunarac
 Milan Levar
 Mirjana Marković
 Slobodan Milošević
 Ratko Mladić
 Mirko Norac
 Dragan Obrenović
 Tihomir Orešković
 Biljana Plavšić
 Ivica Rožić
 Zoran Vuković

References

2003 non-fiction books
Croatian non-fiction literature
Essay collections
International Criminal Tribunal for the former Yugoslavia
Cultural depictions of Slobodan Milošević